Diogo Gil Moniz (formerly Diogo Gil) was a Portuguese nobleman.

Life
He was the eldest son of Gil Aires and wife Leonor Rodrigues.

He was Vedor of the Fazenda of Infante Ferdinand, Duke of Viseu, brother of King Afonso V of Portugal and father of King Manuel I of Portugal.

Marriage and issue
He married Leonor da Silva, daughter of Rui Gomes da Silva, of the Lords of a Chamusca, and wife Branca de Almeida, and had: 
 Francisca Pereira or da Silva, wife of Dom Sancho de Noronha, 3rd Count of Odemira, and had extant issue
 Pedro or Pero Moniz da Silva
 António of St. Thomas, a Hieronymite monk, a reformer of the Monastery of Tomar

Sources
 Manuel João da Costa Felgueiras Gaio, "Nobiliário das Famílias de Portugal", Tomo Vigésimo Primeiro, Título de Monizes, § 17, § 18 e § 19
 Various Authors, "Armorial Lusitano", Lisbon, 1961, pp. 370-372
 Dom Augusto Romano Sanches de Baena e Farinha de Almeida Portugal Sousa e Silva, 1.º Visconde de Sanches de Baena, "Archivo Heraldico-Genealógico", Lisbon, 1872, Volume II, p. CXV
 Cristóvão Alão de Morais, "Pedatura Lusitana", Volume I (reformulated edition), pp. 668-670

Portuguese nobility
Year of birth unknown
Year of death unknown
15th-century Portuguese people